Dukhovshchinsky (masculine), Dukhovshchinskaya (feminine), or Dukhovshchinskoye (neuter) may refer to:
Dukhovshchinsky District, a district of Smolensk Oblast, Russia
Dukhovshchinskoye Urban Settlement, an administrative division and a municipal formation which the town of Dukhovshchina and one rural locality in Dukhovshchinsky District of Smolensk Oblast, Russia are incorporated as